Acanthoscurria antillensis is a species of  large spider, a tarantula in the family Theraphosidae. This species occurs in the Lesser Antilles, hence the specific name "antillensis" meaning "of the Antilles". This species is known in the exotic pet trade as the "Antillean pink patch" tarantula.

See also 
List of Theraphosidae species

References

Theraphosidae
Spiders of North America
Spiders described in 1871